= Rifkus =

Algerian snack brand

Rifkus is an Algerian chips and snacks brand made by Farouk Boudjemline. It has a mini variant, as well as the spicy ones. It began production in November 2024 and it gained massive success in the country where it became the most popular chips brand in Algeria.
